Graham Desmond Kelly  (born 9 May 1941) is a former New Zealand politician.

Biography

Early life and career
Kelly was born in Wellington on 9 May 1941. He married and had five children.

Kelly was trade unionist and was employed by the Clerical Workers' Union until 1973 when he became secretary of the Shop Employees' Union.

Member of Parliament

As a trade union member he became involved in the Labour Party, joining the party in 1963 and was a longtime member of the  electorate committee. In a highly contested selection meeting Kelly was chosen ahead of former All Black and local regional councillor Ken Gray. The selection was criticised by local residents who were critical of Kelly not living in the electorate and suspicions of media reports around an organised campaign to select trade unionists for all open safe seats ahead of the 1987 election. Kelly dismissed the criticism of his and other unionists selections stating he was "his own person" and his background in unions motivated him to be a representative of working people in the area. He also pledged to move from his home in Khandallah to the Porirua area.

He was elected and served as MP for Porirua from 1987 until the 1996 election, when he became MP for the new seat of Mana. He was among several backbenchers elected in 1987 that opposed the Labour government's controversial Rogernomics reforms. He opposed the introduction of Goods and Services Tax before entering parliament and after being elected opposed the proposed flat tax rate, arguing each unfairly distributed taxation burdens on to working class people. He was also critical of how independent cabinet decision making was and campaigned for more substantive input into decisions by the party caucus.

In November 1990 he was appointed as Labour's spokesperson for Fisheries and Senior Citizens by Labour leader Mike Moore. Kelly supported Helen Clark in her successful leadership challenge to Moore after the  election. Under Clark he lost the Senior Citizens portfolio while retaining Fisheries and additionally appointed Shadow Minister of Broadcasting from 1993 to 1996. From 1996 to 1999 his responsibilities shifted again and he was Shadow Minister of Housing and Overseas Aid.

In the 2002 election, he did not stand as an electorate candidate, standing as a list MP and allowing Luamanuvao Winnie Laban to contest Mana. On 29 July 2003, however, he left Parliament in order to take up a position as High Commissioner to Canada. His list seat was taken by the next candidate on Labour's 2002 party list, Moana Mackey.

High Commissioner to Canada
In 2005, Kelly made remarks to a Canadian governmental panel which were regarded by some in New Zealand as offensive to Māori and various immigrant communities. Calls were made for his resignation, and the government criticised Kelly for his comments, for which he apologised.

Later career
Kelly is currently the president of the Association of Former Members of Parliament.

Honours
In the 2004 Queen's Birthday Honours, Kelly was appointed a Companion of the Queen's Service Order for public services.

References

|-

New Zealand Labour Party MPs
Living people
New Zealand list MPs
High Commissioners of New Zealand to Canada
1941 births
Members of the New Zealand House of Representatives
21st-century New Zealand politicians
Companions of the Queen's Service Order